Major General Arthur Verney Hammond  (16 October 1892 – 15 January 1982) was a senior officer of the British Indian Army during the Second World War.

Early life
Hammond was born in Kensington, the son of Sir Arthur Hammond, a British Army officer and recipient of the Victoria Cross, and Edith Jane Wright. He was educated at Wellington College, Berkshire, before attending the Royal Military College, Sandhurst.

Military career
On 6 September 1911 he commissioned onto the Unattached List for the Indian Army, before serving for a year with the Queen's Own Royal West Kent Regiment. On 3 December 1912 he joined his Indian regiment, Queen Victoria's Own Corps of Guides. During the First World War, Hammond served on the North West Frontier between 1915 and 1916, before serving with the Mesopotamia Expeditionary Force in the Mesopotamian campaign from 1917 to 1919, during which he mentioned in despatches. He then served in North West Persia from 1920 to 1921, later attending the Staff College, Quetta, from 1925 to 1926, before returning to India, where he became Brigade Major in 1928. In 1936 he became Commanding Officer of The Guides Cavalry, holding the position until 1938.

At the beginning of the Second World War, he was working as a staff officer at the War Office in London. In 1940 he returned to duties in India and in August 1941 Hammond became commander of the 23rd Indian Infantry Brigade, seeing action in the Japanese conquest of Burma. In June 1942 the brigade was re-designated as the 123rd Indian Infantry Brigade. He led the brigade during the Burma Campaign until November 1943, when he was awarded the Distinguished Service Order. In 1943 he made an aide-de-camp to George VI. In June 1944 Hammond was appointed a Companion of the Order of the Bath and took up the position of Commander, Lucknow District, which he held until October 1945. On 20 January 1947 he retired from the army with the rank of major general.

Personal life
Hammond married firstly Mary Ellen Eaton, the daughter of Rev. Thomas Eaton, in 1919. They had two daughters, but divorced in 1946. He married secondly Edythe Boyes Cooper in 1947.

In retirement he lived in Dorset, where he died in 1982.

References

External links
Indian Army Officers 1939−1945
Generals of World War II

1892 births
1982 deaths
Companions of the Distinguished Service Order
Companions of the Order of the Bath
Graduates of the Royal Military College, Sandhurst
Indian Army personnel of World War I
Indian Army generals of World War II
People educated at Wellington College, Berkshire
British people in colonial India
Queen's Own Royal West Kent Regiment officers
Graduates of the Staff College, Quetta
War Office personnel in World War II
Military personnel from London
British Indian Army generals